Wentworth Cavenagh also known as Wentworth Cavenagh–Mainwaring, (1821 – 5 January 1895) was a politician in colonial South Australia.

Cavenagh was member for Yatala in the South Australian House of Assembly from 17 November 1862 to 24 April 1881; and was Commissioner of Crown Lands, under Henry Strangways, from 3 November 1868 to 30 May 1870, and Commissioner of Public Works in the Henry Ayers Government from 4 March 1872 to 22 July 1873. In 1887 he received permission to bear the title of Honourable. Having married Ellen, daughter of Gordon Mainwaring, who, on the death of her brother in 1891, became entitled to the Whitmore Hall estate, in Staffordshire, he assumed the additional name of Mainwaring.

References 

 

|-

|-

1821 births
1895 deaths
Members of the South Australian House of Assembly
19th-century Australian politicians